Lucius Titius Epidius Aquilinus was a Roman senator of the second century.

Life
He was ordinary consul in the year 125 as the colleague of Marcus Lollius Paulinus Decimus Valerius Asiaticus Saturninus. He is primarily known from inscriptions.

He married Avidia Plautia, daughter of Plautia. It is likely that Aquilinus was the father of Plautius Quintillus, ordinary consul of 159, and Lucius Titius Plautius Aquilinus, ordinary consul of 162. If so, then Aquilinus was most probably married to an Avidia Plautia. Details of Aquilinus' cursus honorum have not yet been recovered.

References  

Imperial Roman consuls
2nd-century Romans
Epidius Aquilinus, Lucius Titius